The 1871 Monaghan by-election was fought on 22 July 1871.  The byelection was fought due to the Death of the incumbent MP of the Conservative Party, Charles Powell Leslie III.  It was won by the Conservative candidate John Leslie.

References

1871 elections in the United Kingdom
By-elections to the Parliament of the United Kingdom in County Monaghan constituencies
1871 elections in Ireland